This is a list of wars fought by Romania since 1859:

The United Principalities of Moldavia and Wallachia (1859–1862) 

The United Principalities of Moldavia and Wallachia did not participate in any wars.

Romanian United Principalities (1862–1866) 

The Romanian United Principalities did not participate in any wars.

Principality of Romania (1866–1881)

Kingdom of Romania (1881–1947)

Romanian People's Republic (1947–1965)

Socialist Republic of Romania (1965–1989)

Post-communist Romania (since 1989)

References 

 
Romania
Wars
Wars